Brays Creek is a perennial stream located in Northern Rivers region in the state of New South Wales, Australia. It is the namesake of the locality of the same name.

See also

 Rivers of New South Wales
 List of rivers of New South Wales (A-K)
 List of rivers of Australia

References

Northern Rivers
Rivers of New South Wales